= Poohhiya Bramha, Asthan =

Indian village

Poohhiya Bramha, Asthan is a village in Gorakhpur, Uttar Pradesh, India. It was founded by Syed Karamat Hussain Jaffri in late 19th century. He had four children(Syed Yousouf Hussain Jaffri, Syed Kashif Hussain Jaffri, Syed Khaleel Hussan Jaffri, Syed Ameer Hussain).
